= Conrad Gotzian =

American businessman and politician

Conrad Gotzian (August 15, 1835 – February 21, 1887) was an American businessman and politician.

Gotzian was born in Berka-on-the Werra, Saxe-Weimar-Eisenach and went to school in that area. He emigrated to the United States in 1852 and then settled in Saint Paul, Minnesota in 1855. Gotzian was a merchant and was involved in the shoe manufacturing business. He was also involved in the Saint Paul Volunteer Fire Department. Gotzian served in the Minnesota House of Representatives in 1883 and 1884. He died at his home in Saint Paul, Minnesota.
